Cochylimorpha pirizanica is a species of moth of the family Tortricidae. It is found in Kyrgyzstan and Iran (Fars Province).

References

Moths described in 1963
Cochylimorpha
Taxa named by Józef Razowski
Moths of Asia